Crawford-Gardner House is a historic home located at Charleston, West Virginia.  Ellis Thayer Crawford was the senior member of Crawford and Ashby, a real estate firm dealing in coal and timber lands. He and his wife built this home
around 1904. It is an American Foursquare-style house that features an intricately patterned wood floor.

It was listed on the National Register of Historic Places in 1984 as part of the South Hills Multiple Resource Area.

References

American Foursquare architecture in West Virginia
Houses in Charleston, West Virginia
Houses completed in 1904
Houses on the National Register of Historic Places in West Virginia
National Register of Historic Places in Charleston, West Virginia